Tomorrow's Child is an Australian television film, or rather a live one-off television play, which aired in 1957 on ABC. Directed by Raymond Menmuir, it is notable as an early example of Australian television comedy and was Australia's first live hour long drama.

Synopsis
Promoted as A satirical comedy of the future, it was set in a fictional police state.

Cast
 James Condon
 Janette Craig
 Queenie Ashton
 Mayne Lynton
 Tom Farley
 Bernard Barber
Lola Brooks

Production
It was based on a 1947 play by John Coates, and written by Alan Seymour.

Cast included James Condon, Janette Craig, Queenie Ashton, and Mayne Lynton. Craig and Ashton later were regulars on Autumn Affair (1958-1959), the first Australian-produced television soap opera.

Broadcast
It aired on Sydney station ABN-2 on 9 April 1957. A kinescope was made of the broadcast and shown in Melbourne on ABV-2 on 26 April 1957, it is not known if the kinescope recording still exists.

See also
 Shell Presents - 1959–1960 series of one-off plays for Australian television
 Ending It - 1957 Australian one-off television play, based on a 1939 BBC TV one-off play
 The Passionate Pianist - 1957 Australian one-off television play
 List of live television plays broadcast on Australian Broadcasting Corporation (1950s)

References

External links
 Tomorrow's Child at IMDb
 1957 Tomorrow's Child at Austlit
 Original play at Austlit

1957 television plays
Australian television plays
Australian Broadcasting Corporation original programming
English-language television shows
Black-and-white Australian television shows
Australian live television shows